Palmaiola Lighthouse is an active lighthouse, placed on the summit of the same name islet, in the Tuscan Archipelago between Piombino and Elba in Rio Marina.

History
The Pisans built on the islet a watch tower in 909 which was restored by Jacopo V Appiano of the Principality of Piombino in 1534; a new lighthouse and the keeper’s house were inaugurated on January 15, 1844, and were operated by the Civil engineering for the Maritime Works; in 1911 the light was transferred to the Regia Marina Lighthouse Service.

Description
The lighthouse consists of one-story white building, surmounted by a quadrangular tower, 14 metres height, with gallery and lantern situated at 105 metres above sea level. The light is active, fully automated and operated by Marina Militare identified by the code number 2016 E.F. Near the building a helipad was erected and used by the Marina Militare EH-101 to fly in regularly the maintenance team. The lighthouse has a solar power unit and emits an alternating single white flashing in a five seconds period visible up to 10 nautical miles.; in 2008 underwent to renewal works.

See also
 Palmaiola
 List of lighthouses in Italy
 Tuscan Archipelago

References

External links

 Servizio Fari Marina Militare 

Lighthouses in Tuscany
Lighthouses completed in 1844
Elba
Rio, Italy
Lighthouses in Italy